Comet was launched in New Brunswick in 1826. She was wrecked on 6 May 1829 in the Torres Strait. Her crew survived. 

Loss: Comet sailed from Sydney on 12 April 1829, bound for Batavia. she reached the Torres Straits on 5 May, and the next day wrecked on a reef. The crew survived on her quarter deck for three days before they were able to launch her boats. They then sailed to Murray Island, where they found , of Aberdeen, Both, master, which rescued them.

Post script
Seven years later Captain Fraser would wreck  on Eliza Reef (near present-day Rockhampton, Queensland), on passage from Sydney for Singapore and Manila.

Citations and references
Citations

References
 

1826 ships
Ships built in New Brunswick
Age of Sail merchant ships of England
Maritime incidents in May 1829
Shipwrecks of the Torres Strait